Hambantota District ( hambantoṭa distrikkaya;  Ampāntōṭṭai māvaṭṭam) is a district in Southern Province, Sri Lanka. It is one of 25 districts of Sri Lanka, the second level administrative division of the country. The district is administered by a District Secretariat headed by a District Secretary (previously known as a Government Agent) appointed by the central government of Sri Lanka.

Hambantota District is located on the southeastern coast of Sri Lanka. It has an area of 2,593 km² and a very dry climate. The district capital is Hambantota town; the administrative headquarters are there as well as the center of salt production. Other prominent towns include Tangalle, Ambalantota, Tissamaharama, and Beliatta.

Before modern development took place after the country gained independence in 1948, the agriculture in the district was characterised by swidden cultivation (chena or slash-and-burn) and, to some extent, paddy cultivation on non-irrigated land. In the highlands, kurakkan — a grain used to make an eatable paste — was cultivated with other grains such as corn. Leonard Woolf's Village in the Jungle provides a highly interesting and insightful account of the people, the land and issues of concern during the British Colonial period as he worked as an assistant government agent for Hambantota.

The area has traditionally been home to Sinhalese and Sri Lankan Malay people, who collectively make up 98% of the district's population. The long history of Malay settlement in the district has impacted the local culture of Hambantota, with Sri Lankan Malay being a shared language between the Sri Lankan Malays and some members of the Sinhalese community.

Demographics

Hambantota District has a population of 596,617 (2011) of whom 96% are considered rural residents. Some 13.4% of the labor force of 244,847 is unemployed — in comparison to the national average of 8.3%.  Of those employed, 42.2% are in the agricultural sector, 23.3% in industry with the remaining 34.5% working in the services sector.

Politics and government

Local government
Hambantota District has 12 local authorities of which one is a Municipal Council, one is an Urban Council and the remaining 10 are Divisional Councils (Pradeshiya Sabha).

Towns

 Hambantota (Municipal Council)
 Tangalle (Urban Council)
 Ambalantota
 Beliatta
 Tissamaharama
 Middeniya
 Angunukolapelessa
 Walasmulla
 Weeraketiya

References

External links 

 
Districts of Sri Lanka